Isidoro Sota García (4 February 1902 – 8 December 1976) was a Mexican footballer (goalkeeper) who participated in the 1930 FIFA World Cup. He played in only one game (versus Chile) and was beaten three times. Sota's club during the tournament was Club América.

References 

1902 births
Year of death missing
Mexican footballers
Mexico international footballers
Association football goalkeepers
Club América footballers
1930 FIFA World Cup players